Ryan Marcus Long (born February 3, 1973) is a former Major League Baseball player. Long played for the Kansas City Royals during the  season. In six games Long had two hits in nine at-bats, with two RBIs. He played right field, batting and throwing right-handed. He was drafted by the Royals in the second round of the 1991 amateur draft. Although he played in only six games for the Royals, Long spent ten seasons playing at various levels in the minor leagues. While playing baseball for Dobie High School in Texas, Long and the Longhorns lost a playoff game against a team in which future New York Yankee, Andy Pettitte played.

Coaching career 
For several years Long was the hitting coach for the Pittsburgh Pirates' High-A affiliate, the Bradenton Marauders in the Florida State League. He previously served as a hitting coach for the Altoona Curve which is the Pirates High-A affiliate and the Burlington Bees, the Midwest League affiliate for the Royals. In 2019, Long was the hitting coach for the Triple-A Indianapolis Indians. He was also batting coach for the Lotte Giants in KBO during the 2020 season.

References

External links

1973 births
Living people
Baseball players from Houston
Birmingham Barons players
Charlotte Knights players
Eugene Emeralds players
Gulf Coast Royals players
Kansas City Royals players
Lehigh Valley Black Diamonds players
Minor league baseball coaches
Newark Bears players
Omaha Royals players
Orlando Rays players
Rockford Royals players
Wichita Wranglers players
Wilmington Blue Rocks players
Winston-Salem Warthogs players